Lawrence M. Hall, Sr. (May 20, 1908 in St. Cloud, Minnesota – February 28, 1973) was a Minnesota Democratic politician and is the longest-serving Speaker of the Minnesota House of Representatives. He was elected to the Minnesota House of Representatives in 1934, and was affiliated with the Democrats, although the legislature was at the time a nonpartisan body. In 1939, he joined with the Conservative Caucus, and was elected to serve as speaker, a position he held for ten years.

Hall left the legislature in 1949. He worked as a lobbyist, before joining the Metropolitan Airports Commission in 1953. He would remain with the body until August 1972, eventually becoming chair of the organization.

References

1908 births
1973 deaths
Speakers of the Minnesota House of Representatives
Democratic Party members of the Minnesota House of Representatives
Politicians from St. Cloud, Minnesota
20th-century American politicians